Trail of the Yukon is a 1949 American Northern film directed by William Beaudine and starring Kirby Grant, Suzanne Dalbert and Bill Edwards. It was based on a novel by James Oliver Curwood about a North-West Mounted Police officer and his faithful German Shepherd dog Chinook. It is part of the Northern genre. The film was popular, and inspired Monogram to make a series of nine further films starring Grant and Chinook.

Plot

Cast
 Kirby Grant as Bob McDonald – Royal NW Mounted 
 Suzanne Dalbert as Marie Laroux 
 Bill Edwards as Jim Blaine 
 Iris Adrian as Paula 
 Dan Seymour as Tom Laroux 
 William Forrest as Banker John Dawson 
 Anthony Warde as Muskeg Joe 
 Maynard Holmes as Henchman Buck 
 Peter Mamakos as Henchman Rand 
 Guy Beach as Matt Blaine 
 Stanley Andrews as Rogers 
 Dick Elliott as Editor Sullivan 
 Jay Silverheels as Poleon 
 Bill Kennedy as Constable, RCMP   
 Harrison Hearne as Bank Teller Frank

Reception 
A Variety review noted that the cast gave "stock performances."

See also
 Trail of the Yukon (1949)
 The Wolf Hunters (1949)
 Snow Dog (1950)
 Call of the Klondike (1950)
 Northwest Territory (1951)
 Yukon Manhunt (1951)
 Yukon Gold (1952)
 Fangs of the Arctic (1953)
 Northern Patrol (1953)
 Yukon Vengeance (1954)

References

Bibliography
 Drew, Bernard. Motion Picture Series and Sequels: A Reference Guide. Routledge, 2013. 
 Marshall, Wendy L. William Beaudine: From Silents to Television. Scarecrow Press, 2005.

External links
 

1949 films
1949 Western (genre) films
American Western (genre) films
American black-and-white films
Corporal Rod Webb (film series)
Films based on novels by James Oliver Curwood
Films directed by William Beaudine
Films produced by Lindsley Parsons
Films set in Yukon
Monogram Pictures films
Northern (genre) films
Royal Canadian Mounted Police in fiction
1940s English-language films
1940s American films